Bhaiksuki is a Unicode block containing characters from the Bhaiksuki alphabet, which is a Brahmi-based script that was used for writing Sanskrit during the 11th and 12th centuries CE, mainly in the present-day states of Bihar and West Bengal in India, and in parts of Bangladesh.

History
The following Unicode-related documents record the purpose and process of defining specific characters in the Bhaiksuki block:

References 

Unicode blocks